Igor Filipović (born 17 April 1992) is a Serbian professional footballer who plays as a centre-back.

References

External links
 
 Igor Filipović stats at utakmica.rs
 

1992 births
Living people
Sportspeople from Užice
Association football defenders
Serbian footballers
FK Čukarički players
FK Mladost Lučani players
FK Sileks players
FK Metalac Gornji Milanovac players
Olympiacos Volos F.C. players
Serbian SuperLiga players
Serbian First League players
Macedonian First Football League players
Kuwait Premier League players
Al-Shabab SC (Kuwait) players
Serbian expatriate footballers
Serbian expatriate sportspeople in Kuwait
Serbian expatriate sportspeople in Greece
Serbian expatriate sportspeople in North Macedonia
Expatriate footballers in Kuwait
Expatriate footballers in Greece
Expatriate footballers in North Macedonia